FC Zenit Saint Petersburg is a Russian football club that was founded in 1925. The club first qualified for UEFA competition as Zenit Leningrad in 1980, when they finished third in the Soviet Top League to reach the 1981–82 UEFA Cup as representatives of the Soviet Union; however, they were knocked out in the first round by Dynamo Dresden of East Germany, losing 6–2 on aggregate. They qualified for the European Cup for the first time in 1985–86 after winning the 1984 Soviet Top League. They qualified for the UEFA Cup twice more before the break-up of the Soviet Union (in 1987–88 and 1989–90), but then had to wait 10 years for another appearance.

After winning the 1998–99 Russian Cup, Zenit qualified for the 1999–2000 UEFA Cup but were again eliminated in the first round by Italian club Bologna, losing 5–2 on aggregate. The 2000s saw Zenit qualify for the UEFA Cup four times – they were knocked out in the first round in 2002–03, the group stage in 2004–05 and the quarter-finals in 2005–06 before claiming their first European title by beating Scottish club Rangers 2–0 in the 2008 UEFA Cup Final at the City of Manchester Stadium. This win meant that they would play in the 2008 UEFA Super Cup against Champions League winners Manchester United, whom they beat 2–1. Following their first three Russian Premier League titles in 2007, 2010 and 2011–12, they qualified for the European Cup (now the UEFA Champions League) for the first time in 20 years, but they have yet to get past the round of 16 stage.

Matches

Overall record
As of 24 February 2022

By competition

By country

Notes

References

Europe
Zenit Saint Petersburg
Soviet football clubs in international competitions